Jerome is an unincorporated community in Union Township, Howard County, Indiana, United States. It is part of the Kokomo, Indiana Metropolitan Statistical Area.

History
Jerome is named after the son of its first settler, Hampton Brown. Jerome Brown later served as a county commissioner. Jerome was once incorporated as a town, in 1877.

Geography

References

Unincorporated communities in Howard County, Indiana
Unincorporated communities in Indiana
Kokomo, Indiana metropolitan area